Judge Knapp may refer to:

Dennis Raymond Knapp (1912–1998), judge of the United States District Court for the Southern District of West Virginia
Martin Augustine Knapp (1843–1923), judge of the United States Courts of Appeals for the Second Circuit and the Fourth Circuit
Whitman Knapp (1909–2004), judge of the United States District Court for the Southern District of New York

See also
Manning M. Knapp (1825–1892), associate justice of the New Jersey Supreme Court